Lachlan Valley Way is a New South Wales country road running from Booligal to north of Yass. It was named after the Lachlan River, and follows its southern bank for the majority of its length.

Route
It then follows the Kidman Way (B87) for about  before turning off to the right and proceeding a further  to Lake Cargelligo. From there it continues to the north and east through Euabalong to Condobolin. This  section of road has three named parts, from west to east. They are Lake Cargelligo-Euabalong Road, Lachlan Valley Way, and Condoblin-Lake Cargelligo Road. From Condoblin the Lachlan Valley Way turns south-east towards Forbes, a further . From Forbes it continues south-east through Gooloogong to Cowra, a further . It then turns south through Boorowa, to end after another  at the Hume Highway north-west of Yass.

History
The passing of the Main Roads Act of 1924 through the Parliament of New South Wales provided for the declaration of Main Roads, roads partially funded by the State government through the Main Roads Board (later the Department of Main Roads, and eventually Transport for NSW). Main Road No. 56 was declared along this road from Forbes, via Cowra to Yass (and continuing northwards via Parkes, Dubbo, Gilgandra and Coonamble eventually to Walgett, and southwards via Canberra eventually to the intersection with Queanbeyan-Braidwood Road, today Kings Highway, at Queanbeyan), Main Road No. 61 from Condoblin to Forbes (and continuing eastwards via Eugowra and Cudal to the intersection with North-Western Highway, today Mitchell Highway, at Orange) and Main Road No. 230 from Lake Cargelligo via Euabalong to Condobolin, on the same day, 8 August 1928. With the passing of the Main Roads (Amendment) Act of 1929 to provide for additional declarations of State Highways and Trunk Roads, these were amended to Trunk Roads 56 and 61 and Main Road 230 on 8 April 1929.

The southern end of Trunk Road 56 was truncated at Bowning when the delaration of State Highway 15 (later named Barton Highway subsumed the former alignment on 19 February 1935; and the northern end was truncated to Forbes when the declaration of State Highway 17 (later named Newell Highway) subsumed the former alignment on 16 March 1938. Trunk Road 61 was re-aligned to run between Orange and Condobolin via Parkes on 6 April 1938; its former alignment between Condobolin and Forbes (and continuing east via Eugowra and Cudal to Orange) was replaced by Main Road 377. Main Road 501 was declared between Lake Cargelligo via Hillston to the intersection with State Highway 21 (later named Cobb Highway) in Booligal on 17 May 1939.

The route - from Booligal to Bowning, along Trunk Road 56 and Main Roads 230 and 377 and 501 - was named Lachlan Valley Way on 23 September, 1970. Main Road 230 had its declaration revoked on 15 March 1996, but the road is still generally known as a part of Lachlan Valley Way despite this. Main Road 501 was divided into two sections between Hillston and Wallanthery, with Main Road 410 (Kidman Way) subsuming the former alignment and officially splitting Lachlan Valley Way into a western section terminating at Hillston, and an eastern section terminating in Wallanthery, on 12 March 2010. 

The passing of the Roads Act of 1993 updated road classifications and the way they could be declared within New South Wales. Under this act, Lachlan Valley Way today retains its declaration as part of Main Road 377, and as Main Roads 56 and 501, from Booligal to Hillston, then from Wallanthery to Lake Cargelligo, then from Condoblin via Forbes, Cowra and Boorowa to Bowning.

Lachlan Valley Way was signed State Route 81 between Cowra and Bowning in 1974. With the conversion to the newer alphanumeric system in 2013, this was replaced with route B81.

Major intersections

See also

 Highways in Australia
 List of highways in New South Wales

References

Highways in New South Wales
Lachlan Shire